Pleurobema cordatum, the Ohio pigtoe, is a species of freshwater mussel, an aquatic bivalve mollusk in the family Unionidae, the river mussels.

This species is endemic to the United States.

References

Molluscs of the United States
cordatum
Bivalves described in 1820
Taxa named by Constantine Samuel Rafinesque
Taxonomy articles created by Polbot